Wonderland Amusement Park (usually simply named Wonderland) may refer to:

Canada's Wonderland, Vaughan, Canada
Dutch Wonderland, Lancaster, Pennsylvania
Wonderland Amusement Park (Beijing), an unfinished park in China
Wonderland Amusement Park (Indianapolis)
Wonderland Amusement Park (Kansas), former park (1905–1918) in Wichita
Wonderland Amusement Park (Massachusetts), park that is the current site of Wonderland Greyhound Park
Wonderland Amusement Park (Minneapolis)
Wonderland Amusement Park (San Diego), former park (1913–1916) in the Ocean Beach neighborhood of San Diego
Wonderland Park (Texas), Amarillo, Texas
Wonderland City, Sydney, Australia
Wonderland Sydney, Sydney, Australia